Easton-Phillipsburg Bridge may refer to:
Easton–Phillipsburg Toll Bridge
Northampton Street Bridge